The dog is a domesticated canid species, Canis familiaris.

Dog(s), doggy, or doggie may also refer to:

Animals
 Species in the family Canidae called "dogs" as a part of their common name:
 African wild dog, Lycaon pictus, of Africa
 Bush dog, Speothos venaticus, of South America
 Indian wild dog, also known as the Dhole, Cuon alpinus, of Asia
 Raccoon dog, Nyctereutes procyonoides, of Asia
 Short-eared dog, Atelocynus microtis, of South America
Dog, a male canine, fox, or wolf as opposed to a bitch, or female dog
Non-canid, animals, e.g.:
 Prairie dogs, Cynomys, a genus of North American social ground squirrels

Places
 Dog Crossing, Georgia, an unincorporated community, United States
 Dog Hollow (Illinois), a valley in Illinois, United States
 Dog Island (Florida), a barrier island in the Gulf of Mexico, United States
 Dog Islands, an island group in the British Virgin Islands
 Dog River (disambiguation)
 Isle of Dogs, a peninsula in East London, United Kingdom
 The Dogs, Wincanton, house in Wincanton, Somerset, England

People

Name
 He Dog (1830–1930), an Oglala Sioux leader
 Mary Crow Dog (1954-2013), a Dakota Sioux author and activist also known as Mary Brave Bird

Alias
 Cynic philosopher Diogenes of Sinope
 Alexandr Dolgopolov, Ukrainian top tennis player
 Duane Chapman, nicknamed "Dog", the star of Dog: the Bounty Hunter
 Al Jourgensen, alias "Dog", an industrial musician
 Doggie (artist), Danish artist

Science and astronomy
 Dog (zodiac), the Chinese zodiac sign
 Hurricane Dog (disambiguation), three tropical cyclones in 1950, 1951 and 1952
 Sirius, the Dog Star, brightest star in Canis Major, the big dog constellation
 Sun dog, an atmospheric phenomenon that consists of a bright spot to the left and right of the Sun

Tools and engineering
 Bench dog, a removable clamp inserted into a workbench to hold an item fast
 Dog, a form of pawl used to secure a chain, as on an anchor windlass
 Dog clutch, a clutch that couples two rotating shafts or components by interference or clearance fit
 Dog (engineering), a tool or part of a tool, such as a pawl, that prevents or imparts movement through physical engagement
 "Dog irons" or "fire dogs", a form of andiron for holding wood in a fireplace, or skewers in place for cooking over a fire
 Feed dogs, movable plates which pull fabric through a sewing machine in discrete steps between stitches
 Lathe dog, a dog which clamps on a work piece to allow it to be revolved by a lathe face-plate

Food and beverages
 Dog, the nickname for Newcastle Brown Ale, an English brand of dark brown beer
 Corn dog (also spelled corndog), a sausage or hot dog on a stick that has been coated in a thick layer of cornmeal batter and deep fried
 Hot dog, a cooked sausage served in a bun

Arts and entertainment
 Artlist Collection: The Dog and Friends, a franchise created by Artlist in Japan in 2000
 The Dog (Goya), a painting by Francisco Goya
 Dulwich Outdoor Gallery (DOG)

Books
 Dogs (manga), by Shirow Miwa, subtitled "Bullets & Carnage"
The Dogs, novel by Ivan Nazhivin 1931

Film
 Dogs (1976 film), a natural horror film
 The Dogs (1979 film), a French film
 The Dog (1992 film), a short experimental film
 Dog (2001 film), an animated short film by Suzie Templeton
 The Dog (2013 film), a documentary about "the real story behind Dog Day Afternoon
 Dogs (2016 film), a Romanian film
 Dog (2022 film), an American comedy film starring Channing Tatum

Television 
 Dog, a television ident for BBC Two, first aired in 1993 (see BBC Two '1991–2001' idents)
 "The Dog" (Seinfeld), an episode of the television series Seinfeld
Dogs (TV series), a 2018 Netflix documentary series

Characters
 Augie Doggie and Doggie Daddy, television cartoon characters
 The main character in the comic strip Footrot Flats
 A minor character in the television show Red Dwarf
 Dog (Half-Life 2), from the video game Half-Life 2
 Dog, in the Nickelodeon TV series CatDog
 Dog, in the 1998 film Lock, Stock and Two Smoking Barrels
 Dog, Daryl Dixon's pet dog introduced in The Walking Dead season 9, episode 7: "Stradivarius"
 Dog, from the Emmy Award-winning children's animation show WordWorld

Music
 Dog, a fad dance

Groups
 Dogs (British band), a British punk music band
 Dogs (French band), a French rock music band
 The Dogs (US punk band), a Michigan proto-punk band
 The Dogs (US hip-hop band), an American hiphop band
 The Dogs, the Finnish band Ile Kallio
The nickname of rapper DMX

Albums
 Dog (album), a 2010 album by Sow
 Dogs (Beware of Safety album), 2009
 Dogs (Nina Nastasia album), 2000
 Dogs, a 2011 album by The Parlor Mob

Songs
 "Dogs" (Damien Rice song), 2007
 "Dogs" (Pink Floyd song), 1977
 "Dogs" (The Who song), 1968
 "Dogs", a song by British heavy metal band Motörhead from Rock 'n' Roll (1987)
 "Dogs", a song by Sun Kil Moon from Benji (2014)
 "Dog", a song by Sly and the Family Stone from their 1967 debut A Whole New Thing
 "The Dog", song by Rufus Thomas
 "Dog", a song by C418 from Minecraft – Volume Alpha

Sports
 Greyhound racing
 "The Dogs" or "The Doggies", nickname for Bulldogs Rugby League Football Club, an Australian football club

Other uses
 Dog, a non-standard hand in the card game poker
 Dog, in some British spelling alphabets, the letter "D"
 Dog, in the strategic planning matrix, an enterprise that in a low-growth, low-profit sector
 Dog soldiers, or Dog Men (Cheyenne: Hotamétaneo'o), one of six Cheyenne military societies
 Dog Latin, English made to resemble Latin

Acronyms
 Deutsche Orient-Gesellschaft, or DOG, the German Oriental Society
 Difference of Gaussians, or DOG, in mathematics
 Digital on-screen graphic, or DOG
 Deployable Operations Group, or DOG, U.S. Coast Guard command

See also
 
 
 Dawg (disambiguation), includes Dawgs
 Dogg (disambiguation)
 Dogz, a game in the Petz series of games
 The Dog (disambiguation), includes The Dogs
 Doggy style (disambiguation)
 Dogging (disambiguation)